The 1924–25 National Challenge Cup was the annual open cup held by the United States Football Association now known as the Lamar Hunt U.S. Open Cup.

History
Teams from the American Soccer League and St. Louis Soccer League had won the previous several Challenge Cups, but dissatisfaction with the financial arrangements led the two leagues to boycott this year’s cup.  While the United States Football Association gained its operating income from annual dues by member teams, most of its income came from its annual challenge cup.  On the other hand, the owners of the top professional teams saw the challenge cup as a money losing competition as they were forced to play obscure amateur teams which tended to have smaller crowds and therefore gate receipts.  After USFA took its cut, the amount distributed to the teams frequently did not cover the travel expenses.  Therefore, the SLSL proposed, and the ASL agreed to, the creation of an American Professional Soccer Championship.  That game series took place in April 1925 at University Field in St. Louis, Missouri.  Over the three games, the Boston Soccer Club defeated the Ben Millers in front of an average crowd of over 10,000 spectators per game.  In contrast, the National Challenge Cup final between the Shawsheen Indians and Chicago Canadian Club, played at the usually high drawing Mark's Stadium, saw only 2,500 spectators, down from the 18,000 who watched the 1924 final.  At a May 1925 meeting, USFA agreed to reduce their percentage of the gate receipts from 33.3% to 15%.  This diffused the ASL and SLSL hostility to the challenge cup leading to their re-entering the competition for 1926.

Eastern Division

Western Division

a) aggregate after 3 games

Final

References

U.S. Open Cup
National Challenge Cup, 1925
1924–25 domestic association football cups